Missing or The Missing may refer to:

Film
Missing (1918 film), an American silent drama directed by James Young
Missing (1982 film), an American historical drama directed by Costa-Gavras
Missing (2007 film) (Vermist), a Belgian film that was a 2007 box office number-one film in Belgium
Missing (2008 film), a Hong Kong horror film directed by Tsui Hark
Missing (2009 film), a South Korean film directed by Kim Sung-hong
Missing (2009 short film), a film starring Susan Glover
Missing (2010 film), a Jordanian film directed by Tariq Rimawi
Missing (2016 film), a South Korean film directed by Lee Eon-hee
Missing (2018 film), an Indian film directed by Mukul Abhyankar
Missing (2019 film), a Hong Kong film directed by Ronnie Chau
Missing, a 2007 film featuring Nao Ōmori
Missing (2023 film), an American thriller film
The Missing (1999 film), an Australian film directed by Manuela Alberti
The Missing (2003 film), an American Western directed by Ron Howard
The Missing (2017 film), a Chinese action crime film directed by Xu Jinglei
The Missing (2020 film), a Philippine film directed by Easy Ferrer.

Literature
Missing (Ward novel), a 1917 novel by Mary Augusta Ward
Missing (Alvtegen novel), a 2000 novel by Karin Alvtegen
Missing (novel series), a 2005 Japanese light novel series and manga
Missing, a Fear Street book by R.L. Stine

The Missing (novel series), a 2008 series of young-adult novels by Margaret Peterson Haddix
The Missing, a 2009 novel by Tim Gautreaux

Music

Albums
Missing (album), a 2014 album by Lala Hsu
Missing (EP), a 1995 EP by Drunk Tank
Missing, a 2005 EP by City and Colour

Songs
"Missing" (Everything but the Girl song), 1994
"Missing" (Teen Top song), 2014
"Missing", a song by Bruce Springsteen from the album The Essential Bruce Springsteen, 2003
"Missing", a song by Evanescence from the album Anywhere but Home, 2004
"Missing", a song by Beck from the album Guero, 2005
"Missing", a song by Flyleaf from the album Memento Mori, 2009
"Missing", a song by Eliza Doolittle from the album Eliza Doolittle, 2010
"Missing", a song by Gucci Mane from the album The Appeal: Georgia's Most Wanted, 2010
"Missing", a song by the xx from the album Coexist, 2012
"Missing", a song by William Michael Morgan from the album Vinyl, 2016
"Missing", a song by Slowthai from the album Nothing Great About Britain, 2019
"Missing", a song by London Grammar from the album Californian Soil, 2021
"Missing", a 1956 song by the McGuire Sisters
"The Missing", by Ministry from the album The Land of Rape and Honey, 1988
"The Missing", by Cassius, Ryan Tedder and Jaw from the album Ibifornia, 2016

Television
Missing (TV program), a 2003 American syndicated missing-persons program
Missing (Canadian TV series) (originally titled 1-800-Missing), 2003
Missing (2006 TV series), a British crime drama
Missing (2009 TV series), a British police drama
Missing (American TV series), 2012
Missing (Singaporean TV series), 2018

The Missing (British TV series), 2014
The Missing (South Korean TV series), 2015
Missing Live (titled Missing from 2005–2007 and 2011), a 2005 British missing-persons morning program

Episodes

Video games
In Memoriam (video game) (US title: Missing: Since January), a 2003 video game
The Missing: J.J. Macfield and the Island of Memories, a 2018 video game

Other
Missing (awareness campaign), a public awareness campaign and NGO in India

See also

Disappear (disambiguation)
Disappeared (disambiguation)
Lost (disambiguation)
Missing in action
Missing person
Missing women (disambiguation)
Mising (disambiguation)